Anna Szabolcsi (//) is a linguist whose research has focused on semantics, syntax, and the syntax–semantics interface. She was born and educated in Hungary, and received her Ph.D. from the Hungarian Academy of Sciences, Budapest.

She is currently a professor of linguistics at New York University. She has been a research fellow at the Research Institute for Linguistics of the Hungarian Academy of Sciences, Budapest, and a professor at UCLA.

Szabolcsi was one of the first to propose the determiner phrase hypothesis and alongside Mark Steedman and others initiated research in combinatory categorial grammar. More recently she has worked on quantification, islands, polarity, verbal complexes, and overt nominative subjects in infinitival complements.

References

External links
 Anna Szabolcsi's Home Page

Semanticists
New York University faculty
Living people
Women linguists
University of California, Los Angeles faculty
Year of birth missing (living people)